Kill Buddha were an American alternative rock band from Los Angeles, California, active in 1992 – 1995. Kill Buddha toured around Southern California mainly playing in West Hollywood, Hollywood and Santa Monica clubs like The Roxy Theatre (West Hollywood), Raji's, and Alligator Lounge. During their formation, grunge was considered the new punk rock, but Kill Buddha did not sound like other acts of the day. Their sound had more pop elements and less metal, while providing a deep groove with edgy guitars.

The main members were Nick Delancy (Ken David Paul), Oscar Nomination (Andrew Burkhart), and Gary Dade. Mike Steele was in the band early on as the drummer, but he only lasted one week, and then Gary settled in. In 1993, David Botkin occupied the drum seat for a year while Gary suffered a nervous breakdown and escaped to North Dakota to recover, apparently, from a bad marriage.

Controversy surrounded the name of the band as most people thought they were anti-Buddhist or anti-religion, but this was not accurate. The idea of the name came from a saying in Buddhism, “Kill the Buddha”. The saying comes from the teachings ascribed to the Chinese Ch'an master Lin-chi I-hsüan (d. 866), ‘If you meet the Buddha, kill the Buddha…in this way, you attain liberation.’ The intention was to shock students into realizing that they themselves were Buddhas, and that they had no need to depend upon, mistakenly objectify, or inordinately revere figures external to themselves.

Earlier band names used were: Luscious God Boys (a play on Keanu Reeves and his band, Dogstar), The Ruling Class, and f stop.

The Los Angeles music scene was still recovering from the Big Hair bands and phony showcases as a result of the prevalent pay-to-play policies that most of the clubs had during this time, so the Buddha's went south to Orange County and performed at Club Mesa for their first show. They liked the place and returned many times, eventually playing their final show there (which was professionally videotaped). The band also had befriended some San Diego musicians and were invited to play in San Diego's alternative clubs, The Casbah (US music venue) and Bodie's World Famous Dive Bar, but the Buddha's always failed to show up.

In late 1992, Kill Buddha entered Paramount Recording Studios (with Barry Conley engineering) and recorded 10 songs in 2 days, all performed live. They entered the studio again in early 1993 to record 4 new songs. All of these recordings were never released, although a few mix tapes did manage to get out to some of their fans. This material included many of their live show staples: Values, Fog, Greenflash (a holdover from Scream From the Trees), I Love You To Pieces, Grand Prix and Because You Stole Cherries, amongst others. Band interest waned on completing these recordings, and stopped altogether when Gary left. They decided to start fresh after David came aboard in late 1993 and recorded 5 new songs (one remains unreleased) at Cadillac Sound Studios.

In early 1994, Kill Buddha released their widely cherished self-titled EP on Deviant Records (US) (currently out of print) which included four songs: Cleopatra, Liar Liar, The Antidote and Laundry. It found radio airplay mainly on KXLU, KNAC, KUCI, 91X as well as other radio stations around Southern California. Oddly, the EP was "rejected" by radio stations KROQ-FM and KLOS, so the band had the rejection letters framed and hung on the wall of their record company. The EP was also a favorite that was played most nights at Raji's in Hollywood. Industry insider Bob Timmons (Geffen Records, Nirvana, Aerosmith, Smashing Pumpkins) was also extremely impressed after seeing them perform and approached them about representation. The EP was making the rounds at CBS Records in Santa Monica and was generating a buzz. Unfortunately, they would never benefit from the goodwill that was building.

Kill Buddha had decided to quit in January 1995 before playing their last show at Club Mesa.

Later, unbeknownst to the individual band members, they all had eventually relocated to San Francisco. Upon discovering this in 1999, they reunited for a one-off gig in October, which was recorded (presently unreleased).

Band members 
Andrew Burkhart (aka Oscar Nomination) - Guitar, Vocals
Ken David Paul (aka Nick Delancy) - Bass, Vocals
Gary Dade - Drums (1992-1993, 1995)
David Botkin - Drums (1993-1994)
Mike Steele (Dalton) - Drums (1992)

Band member history 

Prior to Kill Buddha, Ken, David and Andrew, along with Michael Kerns (Paramount Recording Studios) were in the LA band, Tocan (1978–1980).

Gary Dade was previously a member of LA metal band Tempered Steel (1983–1985), influential industrial LA band Scream From The Trees (1987–1989) (sometimes with Andrew) and also appears on Bruce Drake's first solo release, Locust (2004). Gary Dade (2008) played and recorded with Smokin' 66 (www.myspace.com/smokinsixtysix), based in Seattle.  The band released a 6-song album in February 2009, "Smokin 66".  The name of the band came from bass player, Todd Perkins' restored 1966 Chevy Malibu, which had a personalized license plate reading "Smokin66".  In 2009, Smokin 66 parted ways with singer Shannon.  Presently, the band is known as Deliciously Infectious.  They are presently on Hiatus after recording and performing in the Seattle area.  In October 2020, Deliciously Infectious released a new album, Psychedelic Funk Metal.  In November 2020, production began on a follow up album, which is tentative for release in spring of 2021.  http://www.deliciouslyinfectious.com

David Botkin (son of Perry Botkin Jr.) was a member of The Men (1991–1992). David also appears on the Dr. Demento novelty track, Down with V.E.G. by The Amazing Onionheads (1994), which Andrew produced. Ken and David were in a "Men" side project band, Jimi's Kids (1991). During 2008–2009, David was playing in an L.A. area band which sometimes features Slash on guitar. David's current project is The Ooks of Hazzard, noted for their cover of MGMT's song "Kids", which went viral on YouTube in April 2010.

Andrew and Gary formed Joy Bang in 1995 as an on again, off again project (currently on hiatus), after Kill Buddha dissolved. A three-song EP was released in 1995 (currently out of print). Some new material was recorded in 2007. Andrew also appears on Jackson Kayne's single, A Post Christmas (1987). Andrew and Mike Steele were also in Ray Rae's Tribute to Hendrix band (1989–1991), which performed around Los Angeles area clubs and colleges.

References

External links
http://www.answers.com/topic/kill-the-buddha
www.myspace.com/smokinsixtysix
http://www.killbuddha.com Kill Buddha web site
 http://www.deliciouslyinfectious.com

Alternative rock groups from California
Musical groups from Los Angeles
Musical groups established in 1992
Musical groups disestablished in 1995